Mossop, a surname of English origin, may refer to:

Sir Allan Mossop (1887-1965) Chief Judge of the British Supreme Court for China
Brian Mossop, the complainant in Canada (Attorney General) v. Mossop (1993)
Henry Mossop (1729–1773), Irish actor
Irene Mossop (1904–1988), British writer
Jennifer Mossop, Canadian politician
John Mossop (born 1959), Australian rules footballer
Lee Mossop (born 1989), English rugby league footballer
Rex Mossop (1928-2011), Australian dual-code rugby footballer
William Mossop (1751–1805), Irish medallist and founder of the art in Ireland